Dar Parusheh (also Romanized as Dār Parūsheh and Dārparūsheh; also known as Dāl Parūsheh and Do Āb) is a village in Helilan Rural District, Helilan District, Chardavol County, Ilam Province, Iran. At the 2006 census, its population was 323, in 63 families. The village is populated by Kurds.

References 

Populated places in Chardavol County
Kurdish settlements in Ilam Province